Revolution Cotton Mills, also known as Revolution Division and Cone Mills, is a historic cotton mill complex located at Greensboro, Guilford County, North Carolina. The complex was built between 1900 and the mid-20th century and is an example of "slow burning construction."  It includes 12 contributing buildings and 2 contributing structures.  They include the main mill building, warehouses, weave room and machine shop, bleachery and dye room, storage/shipping/office building, and yellow brick chimney stack. The mill ceased operation in February 1982.

It was listed on the National Register of Historic Places in 1984.

A Winston-Salem company bought the complex for the purpose of converting it into condominiums and a shopping center. Frank Auman and Jim Peeples converted half the space into offices but after they defaulted on a loan, the property went into foreclosure. In September 2012, Self-Help Ventures bid $8 million, and renovation work began in Spring 2013. The section already upgraded had 45 tenants, and the remaining space could have 90 more. In December 2015, the city council approved an incentive grant of $1 million which required Self Help to invest $85 million by 2018. Plans included offices, artist space and 142 apartments.

References

Textile mills in North Carolina
Industrial buildings and structures on the National Register of Historic Places in North Carolina
Industrial buildings completed in 1900
Buildings and structures in Greensboro, North Carolina
National Register of Historic Places in Guilford County, North Carolina